was the 4th daimyō of Odawara Domain in Sagami Province, (modern-day Kanagawa Prefecture) in mid-Edo period Japan. His courtesy title was Kaga no Kami.

Biography
Ōkubo Tadamasa was the sixth son of Ōkubo Tadamasu, the second daimyō of Odawara, and was born at the domain's residence in Edo. He became clan leader and daimyō of Odawara on the death of his father in 1713.  At the time, 6,000 koku of his revenues were transferred to his younger brother.

Tadamasa faced the daunting task of attempting to reduce the massive debt incurred by his father to the Tokugawa shogunate due to the Great Genroku earthquake and the Hōei eruption of Mount Fuji, and associated aftershocks, crop failures and floods. Although he encouraged the migration of artisans to Odawara and the opening of new rice lands, high taxation and increasingly severe inflation led to civil unrest in Odawara-juku. Tadamasa died of illness on November 20, 1732, at the domain's Edo residence, His grave is at the clan temple of Saisho-ji in Setagaya, Tokyo.

Tadamasa was married to an adopted daughter of Yanagisawa Yoshiyasu, the senior advisor to Shōgun Tokugawa Tsunayoshi.

References
 Papinot, Edmond. (1906) Dictionnaire d'histoire et de géographie du japon. Tokyo: Librarie Sansaisha.Nobiliaire du japon 1906  (digitised 2003)
 The content of much of this article was derived from that of the corresponding article on Japanese Wikipedia.

Fudai daimyo
Tadamasa
1692 births
1732 deaths
People from Tokyo